Carlos Emiro Gutiérrez Jerez (born 3 November 1960) is a Colombian former road cyclist. Professional from 1985 to 1990, he most notably won a stage of the 1987 Vuelta a España.

Major results
1980
 1st Stage 2b Vuelta de la Juventud de Colombia
1983
 1st Stage 8 Vuelta a Colombia
1984
 1st Overall Tour de Martinique
1987
 1st Stage 13 Vuelta a España
 9th Trofeo Masferrer

Grand Tour general classification results timeline

References

External links

1960 births
Living people
Colombian male cyclists
Colombian Vuelta a España stage winners
People from Bucaramanga
20th-century Colombian people